Justine Mules (born 15 December 1994) is an Australian rules footballer playing for the Port Adelaide Football Club in the AFL Women's competition. She was drafted by Adelaide with their seventeenth selection and 133rd overall in the 2016 AFL Women's draft.

AFLW career
Mules made her AFLW debut in the thirty-six point win against  at Thebarton Oval in the opening round of the 2017 season. She played her first consecutive games for the season in the round seven match against  at Olympic Park Oval and when she was a part of Adelaide's premiership side after the club defeated  by six points at Metricon Stadium in the AFL Women's Grand Final. She missed three matches in her debut season to finish with five matches.

Adelaide signed Mules for the 2018 season during the trade period in May 2017.

Mules signed for the inaugural Port Adelaide Football Club AFLW list in mid-2022.

Personal life
Mules has Filipino ancestry.

References

External links 

1994 births
Living people
Adelaide Football Club (AFLW) players
Australian rules footballers from South Australia
Australian people of Filipino descent